Clobazam, sold under the brand names Frisium, Onfi and others, is a benzodiazepine class medication that was patented in 1968. Clobazam was first synthesized in 1966 and first published in 1969. Clobazam was originally marketed as an anxioselective anxiolytic since 1970, and an anticonvulsant since 1984. The primary drug-development goal was to provide greater anxiolytic, anti-obsessive efficacy with fewer benzodiazepine-related side effects.

Medical uses
Clobazam is used for its anxiolytic effect, and as an adjunctive therapy in epilepsy.

As an adjunctive therapy in epilepsy, it is used in patients who have not responded to first-line drugs and in children who are refractory to first-line drugs. It is unclear if there are any benefits to clobazam over other seizure medications for children with Rolandic epilepsy or other epileptic syndromes. It is not recommended for use in children between the ages of six months and three years, unless there is a compelling need. In addition to epilepsy and severe anxiety, clobazam is also approved as a short-term (2–4 weeks) adjunctive agent in schizophrenia and other psychotic disorders to manage anxiety or agitation.

Clobazam is sometimes used for refractory epilepsies. However, long-term prophylactic treatment of epilepsy may have considerable drawbacks, most importantly decreased antiepileptic effects due to drug tolerance which may render long-term therapy less effective. Other antiepileptic drugs may therefore be preferred for the long-term management of epilepsy. Furthermore, benzodiazepines may have the drawback, particularly after long-term use, of causing rebound seizures upon abrupt or over-rapid discontinuation of therapy forming part of the benzodiazepine withdrawal syndrome.

Clobazam is approved in Canada for add-on use in tonic-clonic, complex partial, and myoclonic seizures. Clobazam is approved for adjunctive therapy in complex partial seizures, certain types of status epilepticus, specifically the mycolonic, myoclonic-absent, simple partial, complex partial, and tonic varieties, and non-status absence seizures. It is also approved for the treatment of anxiety.

In India, clobazam is approved for use as an adjunctive therapy in epilepsy, and in acute and chronic anxiety. In Japan, clobazam is approved for adjunctive therapy in treatment-resistant epilepsy featuring complex partial seizures. In New Zealand, clobazam is marketed as Frisium In the United Kingdom clobazam (Frisium) is approved for short-term (2–4 weeks) relief of acute anxiety in patients who have not responded to other drugs, with or without insomnia and without uncontrolled clinical depression. It was not approved in the United States until October 25, 2011, when it was approved for the adjunctive treatment of seizures associated with Lennox-Gastaut syndrome in patients 2 years of age or older.

Contraindications
Clobazam should be used with great care in patients with the following disorders:
 Myasthenia gravis.
 Sleep apnea.
 Severe liver diseases such as cirrhosis and hepatitis.
 Severe respiratory failure.

Benzodiazepines require special precaution if used in the elderly, during pregnancy, in children, alcohol or drug-dependent individuals, and individuals with comorbid psychiatric disorders.

Side effects

In September 2020, the U.S. Food and Drug Administration (FDA) required the boxed warning be updated for all benzodiazepine medicines to describe the risks of abuse, misuse, addiction, physical dependence, and withdrawal reactions consistently across all the medicines in the class.

Common
Common side effects include fever,  drooling, and constipation.

Post-marketing experience
 Hives.
 Rashes.

Warnings and precautions
In December 2013, the FDA added warnings to the label for clobazam, that it can cause serious skin reactions, Stevens–Johnson syndrome, and toxic epidermal necrolysis, especially in the first eight weeks of treatment.

Drug interactions
 Alcohol increases bioavailability by 50%; compounded depressant effect may precipitate life-threatening toxicity.
 Cimetidine increases the effects of clobazam.
 Valproate.

Overdose
Overdose and intoxication with benzodiazepines, including clobazam, may lead to CNS depression, associated with drowsiness, confusion, and lethargy, possibly progressing to ataxia, respiratory depression, hypotension, and coma or death. The risk of a fatal outcome is increased in cases of combined poisoning with other CNS depressants, including alcohol.

Abuse potential and addiction

Classic (non-anxioselective) benzodiazepines in animal studies have been shown to increase reward-seeking behaviours which may suggest an increased risk of addictive behavioural patterns. Clobazam abuse has been reported in some countries, according to a 1983 World Health Organisation report.

Dependence and withdrawal
In humans, tolerance to the anticonvulsant effects of clobazam may occur and withdrawal seizures may occur during abrupt or overrapid withdrawal.

Clobazam as with other benzodiazepine drugs can lead to physical dependence, addiction, and what is known as the benzodiazepine withdrawal syndrome. Withdrawal from clobazam or other benzodiazepines after regular use often leads to withdrawal symptoms which are similar to those seen during alcohol and barbiturate withdrawal. The higher the dosage and the longer the drug is taken, the greater the risk of experiencing unpleasant withdrawal symptoms. Benzodiazepine treatment should only be discontinued via a slow and gradual dose reduction regimen.

Pharmacology
Clobazam is predominantly a positive allosteric modulator at the GABAA receptor with some speculated additional activity at sodium channels and voltage-sensitive calcium channels.

Like other 1,5-benzodiazepines (for example, arfendazam, lofendazam, or CP-1414S), the active metabolite N-desmethylclobazam has less affinity for the α1 subunit of the GABAA receptor compared to the 1,4-benzodiazepines. It has higher affinity for α2 containing receptors, where it has positive modulatory activity.

In a double-blind placebo-controlled trial published in 1990 comparing it to clonazepam, 10 mg of clobazam was shown to be less sedative than either 0.5 mg or 1 mg of clonazepam.

The α1 subtype of the GABAA receptor, was shown to be responsible for the sedative effects of diazepam by McKernan et al. in 2000, who also showed that its anxiolytic and anticonvulsant properties could still be seen in mice whose α1 receptors were insensitive to diazepam.

In 1996, Nakamura et al. reported that clobazam and its active metabolite, N-desmethylclobazam (norclobazam), work by enhancing GABA-activated chloride influx at GABAA receptors, creating a hyperpolarizing, inhibitory postsynaptic potential. It was also reported that these effects were inhibited by the GABA antagonist flumazenil, and that clobazam acts more efficiently in GABA-deficient brain tissue.

Metabolism
Clobazam has two major metabolites: N-desmethylclobazam and 4′-hydroxyclobazam, the former of which is active. The demethylation is facilitated by CYP2C19, CYP3A4, and CYP2B6 and the 4-hydroxyclobazam by CYP2C18 and CYP2C19.

Chemistry
Clobazam is a 1,5-benzodiazepine, meaning that its diazepine ring has nitrogen atoms at the 1 and 5 positions (instead of the usual 1 and 4).

It is not soluble in water and is available in oral form only.

History
Clobazam was discovered at the Maestretti Research Laboratories in Milan and was first published in 1969; Maestretti was acquired by Roussel Uclaf which became part of Sanofi.

See also 
 Benzodiazepine dependence
 Effects of long-term benzodiazepine use

References

Further reading

External links 
 

Benzodiazepines
Chloroarenes
CYP2D6 inhibitors
CYP3A4 inducers
GABAA receptor positive allosteric modulators
Lactams